The 1940 Rice Owls football team was an American football team that represented Rice University as a member of the Southwest Conference (SWC) during the 1940 college football season. In its first season under head coach Jess Neely, the team compiled a 7–3 record (4–2 against SWC opponents) and outscored opponents by a total of 131 to 78.

Schedule

References

Rice
Rice Owls football seasons
Rice Owls football